The Khalije Fars (Persian Gulf) class is a destroyer class, the class was previously designated a training ship. 
In terms of size and armament the vessel is the first true destroyer built by Iran.

Many experts believe that it was referred to as a training vessel in order to cover the real goal of the vessel. 
The class is five times larger than the Jamaran, which means it is at least 5,500 tons and 7,000-7,500 tons full. A model which appeared in November 2014 shows a radar above the destroyer.

See also

References 

Destroyer classes
Destroyers of the Islamic Republic of Iran Navy
Ship classes of the Islamic Republic of Iran Navy
Military projects